The Persian scale is a musical scale occasionally found in guitar scale books, along with other scales inspired by Middle Eastern music. It is characterized by the liberal use of half steps (4), augmented seconds (2), and frequent use of chromaticism. Compare this to the one augmented second of the harmonic minor or the use of only two half-steps in all diatonic scales. This is also the Locrian mode with a major third and major seventh degree.

In Hindustani Classical Music, this corresponds to the raga Lalit.

The sequence of steps is as follows:
H, WH, H, H, W, WH, H
(W = Whole step - H = Half step)

Beginning on C:
C, D♭, E, F, G♭, A♭, B, C

Modes
This rather unusual scale contains the following modes, with rather debatable names: 
{| class="wikitable"
|-
! align="center" | Mode
! align="center" | Name of scale
! colspan="8" align="center" | Degrees
|-
| align="center" | 1
| Persian Scale ||   1 || 2 || 3 || 4 || 5 || 6 || 7 || 8
|-
| align="center" | 2
| Ionian 2 6 ||  1 ||  2 || 3 || 4 || 5 || 6 || 7 || 8
|-
| align="center" | 3
| Ultraphrygian 3 ||   1 || 2 || 3 || 4 || 5 || 6 || 7 || 8
|-
| align="center" | 4
| Todi Thaat ||   1 ||   2 || 3 || 4 || 5 || 6 || 7 || 8
|-
| align="center" | 5
| Lydian 3 6 ||   1 || 2 || 3 || 4 || 5 || 6 || 7 || 8
|-
| align="center" | 6
| Mixolydian Augmented 2 ||   1 ||  2 || 3 || 4 || 5 || 6 || 7 || 8
|-
| align="center" | 7
| Chromatic Hypophrygian Inverse ||   1 || 2 || 3|| 4 || 5 || 6 || 7 || 8
|}

See also
It is most closely related to the Phrygian dominant scale as their bottom tetrachords are identical. It can also be obtained by flattening the fifth degree of the double harmonic scale.

Sources

Further reading
Hewitt, Michael. Musical Scales of the World. The Note Tree. 2013. .

External links
 Persian Scale demonstrated for a Guitar
 The Persian Scale arranged for guitar in 3 note per string and 3 octave shapes

Heptatonic scales
Hemitonic scales
Tritonic scales
Musical scales with augmented seconds